A 2001 bronze statue of Montreal Mayor Jean Drapeau by Annick Bourgeau is
installed in Montreal's Place de la Dauversière, in Quebec, Canada.

References

External links

 

Bronze sculptures in Canada
Cultural depictions of Canadian men
Cultural depictions of lawyers
Cultural depictions of politicians
Monuments and memorials in Montreal
Old Montreal
Outdoor sculptures in Montreal
Sculptures of men in Canada
Statues in Canada
Statues of politicians